Halleck J. Mantz (September 23, 1877 – November 14, 1958) was a justice of the Iowa Supreme Court from January 1, 1943, to January 1, 1953, appointed from Audubon County, Iowa.

References

External links

Justices of the Iowa Supreme Court
1877 births
1958 deaths